San Bartolomé Jocotenango is a municipality in the Guatemalan department of El Quiché.

The celebrations for the town's patron saint, San Bartolomé Apóstol, are on 22-25 of August.

Municipalities of the Quiché Department